Corinth is an unincorporated community in Perry County, Mississippi, United States.

References

Unincorporated communities in Perry County, Mississippi
Unincorporated communities in Mississippi